This is a list of yearly New England Conference football standings.

New England standings

References

New England Conference
Standings